Issenheim is a commune in the Haut-Rhin department in Grand Est in north-eastern France.

The Isenheim Altarpiece, currently on display at the Unterlinden Museum of Colmar, was completed in 1515 by Matthias Grünewald for a local monastery.

Among his many other titles, Prince Albert II of Monaco is ceremonially styled as "Seigneur of Issenheim".

See also
 Communes of the Haut-Rhin département

References

Communes of Haut-Rhin